The Creekmore 34 is an American sailboat that was designed by Lee Creekmore as a cruiser and first built in 1975.

The Creekmore 34 design was developed into the Endeavour 37 in 1977.

Production
The design was built by Creekmore Boats in the United States, starting in 1977, but it is now out of production.

Design
The Creekmore 34 is a recreational keelboat, built predominantly of fiberglass, with wood trim. It has a masthead sloop rig, a raked stem, a reverse transom, a keel-mounted rudder and a fixed modified long keel, with a cut-away forefoot. It displaces  and carries  of ballast.

It is fitted with an inboard engine for docking and maneuvering.

The boat can be fitted with jib or a genoa for upwind sailing or a spinnaker for downwind sailing.

See also
List of sailing boat types

Related development
Endeavour 37

Similar sailboats
Beneteau 331
Beneteau First Class 10
C&C 34
C&C 34/36
Catalina 34
Coast 34
Columbia 34
Columbia 34 Mark II
Crown 34
CS 34
Express 34
Hunter 34
San Juan 34
Sea Sprite 34
Sun Odyssey 349
Tartan 34 C
Tartan 34-2
Viking 34

References

External links
Creekmore 34 photo
Creekmore 34 photo, showing keel and rudder configuration
Photo of a Creekmore 34
Photo of a Creekmore 34

Keelboats
1970s sailboat type designs
Sailing yachts
Sailboat type designs by Lee Creekmore
Sailboat types built by Creekmore Boats